Ardınçpınarı (former İlibas) is a village in Gülnar district of Mersin Province, Turkey. At  it is situated to the west of Gülnar. The population of the village was 223 as of 2012.

References

Villages in Gülnar District